Etadunna is a  locality in the Australian state of South Australia located about  north of the capital city of Adelaide and about  north-east of the town of Marree.

Location and description
It is located within the federal Division of Grey, the state electoral district of Stuart, the Pastoral Unincorporated Area of South Australia and the state’s Far North region.

Etadunna consists of a landscape that is described as an “extensive dunefield interrupted by large claypans grading into a large playa complex of salt lakes with gypsum dunes, and surrounding plain with channels and dunes”.

The Birdsville Track passes through the locality from south to north, while the watercourse of Cooper Creek passes from east to west across its northern end. Features associated with the Cooper Creek watercourse include the northern end of Lake Gregory, which is located in the locality’s south-eastern corner.

The principal land uses within the locality are primary production and conservation, with the former being associated with the grazing of cattle and the latter concerning the Coongie Lakes wetland system on the locality’s east side.

Etadunna was located within an area shared with a number of adjoining localities which was surveyed during the 2016 Australian census in August 2016 and was found to have a population of 63 people.

History
The locality name was gazetted on 26 April 2013 in respect to “the long established local name” which is derived from the pastoral lease called Etadunna Station.

Places of cultural and natural heritage significance

Places of cultural and natural heritage significance either wholly or partly located within the locality include:
the Coongie Lakes wetland system which part is located in the locality's north-east and which is listed as both a Ramsar and a DIWA wetland;
the Killalpaninna Mission site and the Lake Palankarinna Fossil Reserve which are listed on the South Australian Heritage Register and;
the "shipwreck" of the barge MV Tom Brennan which is listed as a historic shipwreck in South Australia.

References

Notes

Citations

Towns in South Australia
Far North (South Australia)
Places in the unincorporated areas of South Australia